A prismatic joint is a one-degree-of-freedom kinematic pair which constrains the motion of two bodies to sliding along a common axis, without rotation; for this reason it is often called a slider (as in the slider-crank linkage) or a sliding pair. They are often utilized in hydraulic and pneumatic cylinders. 

A prismatic joint can be formed with a polygonal cross-section to resist rotation. Examples of this include the dovetail joint and linear bearings.

See also

 Cylindrical joint
 Degrees of freedom (mechanics)
 Kinematic pair
 Kinematics
 Mechanical joint
 Revolute joint

References 

Kinematics
Rigid bodies